Kandala (or similar) may refer to:
Kandala (pogost), a Sami pogost (populated place) in Kolsky Uyezd of the Tsardom of Russia
Kandala Subrahmanyam (b. 1920), Indian lawyer, socialist leader, freedom activist, and parliamentarian
Kevin Kandala (b. 1992), Zimbabwean first-class cricketer

See also
Kandla, a port in Gujarat state, India
Kandhla, town in Uttar Pradesh, India
Khandala, hill station in Maharashtra, India 
Qandala, an ancient port city in Somalia